Pamela Nomvete (born 1963) is an Ethiopian-born South African/British actress.

Life
Pamela Nomvete was born in Ethiopia to South African parents. She spent her childhood in many different countries, and attended boarding school in the United Kingdom, later studying at the Royal Welsh College of Music and Drama. At one point she lived in Manchester, where her sister was a student. After working as an actress in the United Kingdom, Nomvete moved to Johannesburg, South Africa in 1994, after the election of Nelson Mandela as president and the formal end of apartheid.

In the 1990s, Nomvete embarked on a television career, achieving fame in the South African soap opera Generations. Her character Ntsiki Lukhele was "TV's ultimate super-bitch: power-hungry, manipulative and deadly". However, Nomvete herself struggled with depression after her husband's infidelity and her divorce. As her life unravelled, at one point she was living in her car, selling clothes for food and cigarettes.

In Zulu Love Letter (2004), Nomvete played Thandi, a single mother and journalist struggling to communicate with her estranged thirteen-year-old daughter. When Thandi was pregnant with her child, she had been attacked by an apartheid hit squad, leaving the child deaf mute. Nomvete's performance won her a FESPACO Best Actress Award in 2005.

In 2012–13, she appeared in the long-running UK soap opera Coronation Street, playing Mandy Kamara, an old flame of the character Lloyd Mullaney (played by Craig Charles). It would later be discovered that Lloyd was the biological father of Mandy's daughter Jenna.

In 2013 she published an autobiography, Dancing to the Beat of the Drum: In Search of My Spiritual Home.

Nomvete practices Nichiren Buddhism.

Film appearances
 Born Free: A New Adventure, 1996
 Zulu Love Letter, 2004
 Sometimes in April, 2005
 Lockdown, 2021

Stage appearances
 Now or Later by Christopher Shinn at the Royal Court Theatre, 2008
 Welcome to Thebes by Moira Buffini at the Royal National Theatre, 2010

References

External links
 
 Pamela Nomvete Pamela Nomvete,  Encyclopaedia of South African Theatre, Film, Media and Performance (ESAT).

1964 births
Living people
South African soap opera actresses
South African film actresses
South African stage actresses
Ethiopian emigrants to South Africa
20th-century South African actresses
21st-century South African actresses
Alumni of the Royal Welsh College of Music & Drama
Nichiren Buddhists